Dominika Misterska-Zasowska (born 20 July 1979 in Łódź) is a Polish weightlifter. She won a silver medal for the middleweight division at the 2005 European Weightlifting Championships in Sofia, Bulgaria, and bronze at the 2006 European Weightlifting Championships in Władysławowo, Poland.

Misterska-Zasowska represented Poland at the 2008 Summer Olympics in Beijing, where she competed for the women's middleweight category (63 kg). Misterska-Zasowska placed eleventh in this event, as she successfully lifted 94 kg in the single-motion snatch, and hoisted 117 kg in the two-part, shoulder-to-overhead clean and jerk, for a total of 211 kg.

References

External links
 NBC Olympics Profile

Polish female weightlifters
1979 births
Living people
Olympic weightlifters of Poland
Weightlifters at the 2008 Summer Olympics
Sportspeople from Łódź
European Weightlifting Championships medalists
21st-century Polish women
20th-century Polish women